Pherupur Ramkhera is a village of Haridwar district of the Indian state of Uttarakhand state. Its population is approximately 5000. It is situated on national Highway 334A which connects Haridwar in Uttarakhand to Purkaji in Uttar Pradesh.It has a badi chopal also known as CHAUHANO KI CHOPAL which is built in around 1938 and there is a neem tree there which is believed to be older than 250 years, As the villagers told it has been here for sixth generations. It is a village of all community which lives together.

Amenities 
Basic facilities are available in this village. A primary health care centre, an animal hospital, banks, ATMs, a police station and petrol station are available,2 banquet hall (nirbhay farm house  & Bhai Parmanand farm house). All roads are made of concrete and contain a proper drainage system.

Housing 
Each family in this village lives in houses built using concrete. New housing society (Gokul green city and Maharana Pratap enclave) has built in the village to make the village more developed.

Economy 
Most villagers are farmers, however, this trend has changed. Families have begun to focus on education.

Demographics 
Villagers are mostly Hindus (95%), but include Muslims (4%), and others (1%).

Education 
The village hosts three primary schools, three Private English medium schools and one intermediate school and one degree College named as pherupur inter College, DPS (Delhi public school) committee has started a new branch  in the village and one nursing college named as shri ram nursing college is established in the village.

References 

Villages in Haridwar district